The 1973 Oakland Raiders season was the team's 14th season, and fourth in the National Football League.

In Week Two of the regular season, the Raiders defeated the Miami Dolphins, snapping Miami's 18-game winning-streak including a perfect season in 1972.

For the third time in four seasons, the Raiders won the AFC West title. They exacted a measure of revenge by defeating the Pittsburgh Steelers in the AFC Division Round game, one year following the Immaculate Reception loss. But the Raiders failed to reach the Super Bowl as they lost to Miami in the AFC Championship Game.

Offseason

Draft

Roster

Regular season

Schedule

Season summary

Week 1 at Vikings

Week 2 vs. Dolphins

The Raiders became the first team to defeat Miami since Super Bowl VI.

Week 3 at Chiefs

Week 4 at Cardinals

Week 5 at Chargers

Week 6 at Broncos

Week 7 at Colts

Week 8 vs. Giants

Week 9 vs. Steelers

Week 10 vs. Browns

Week 11 vs. Chargers

Week 12 at Oilers

Week 13 vs. Chiefs

Week 14 vs. Broncos

Standings

Playoffs

Divisional

Conference Championship

Awards and honors

References

Raiders on Pro Football Reference
Raiders on Database Football

Oakland
AFC West championship seasons
Oakland Raiders seasons
Oakland Raiders